William Mills Irwin (born April 11, 1950)  is an American actor, clown, and comedian. He began as a vaudeville-style stage performer and has been noted for his contribution to the renaissance of American circus during the 1970s. He has made a number of appearances on film and television, and he won a Tony Award for his role in Who's Afraid of Virginia Woolf? on Broadway. He is also known as Mr. Noodle on the Sesame Street segment Elmo's World, has appeared in the Sesame Street film short Does Air Move Things?, regularly appeared as Dr. Peter Lindstrom on Law & Order: Special Victims Unit, and had a recurring role as "The Dick & Jane Killer" on CSI: Crime Scene Investigation. From 2017 to 2019, he appeared as Cary Loudermilk on the FX television series Legion.

Early life
Irwin was born in Santa Monica, California, the son of Elizabeth (née Mills), a teacher, and Horace G. Irwin, an aerospace engineer. He graduated from Oberlin College in 1974 and attended Ringling Brothers and Barnum & Bailey Clown College the following year. In 1975, he helped found the Pickle Family Circus in San Francisco, California. He credits his experience with the circus, performing in schools under the Comprehensive Employment and Training Act, as having made him a working artist. In 1979, Irwin left the company to pursue stage work.

Career

Creator and writer
Irwin has created several highly regarded stage shows that incorporate elements of clowning, often in collaboration with composer Doug Skinner. These works included The Regard of Flight (1982), which ran on Broadway at the Vivian Beaumont Theatre in April 1987 for 17 performances. Largely New York (1989), Fool Moon (1993), The Harlequin Studies (2003), and Mr. Fox: A Rumination (2004). Mr. Fox is a production that Irwin has worked on for years, a biography of 19th century clown George Washington Lafayette Fox that also has autobiographical elements. In 2013, he teamed with his occasional partner David Shiner to create and perform in the Off-Broadway "clowning revue-with-music" Old Hats along with actress and musician Nellie McKay. Old Hats won the 2013 Drama Desk Award for Outstanding Revue. Old Hats was revived in New York City in 2016, with Shiner and Irwin returning and a new third performer, musician Shaina Taub, performing with her band between the sketches. 

He adapted Molière's play Les Fourberies de Scapin as a comedy called Scapin, and has played the title role in several productions. He appeared in the play at the off-Broadway Roundabout Theatre Company Laura Pels Theatre in January through March 1997, after performing in the play at the Seattle Rep. His adaptation allowed him to incorporate his signature clowning routines into the course of the action.

In 1996, Irwin performed with The Cadets Drum and Bugle Corps at the 1996 Summer Olympics, in a "band on the run" sequence where he played Dr. Hubert Peterson of the fictitious Federation of United Marching Associations of America.

Actor

Although Irwin is best known for his theatrical clown work, he has also been featured in a number of dramatic plays. Irwin appeared with Steve Martin and Robin Williams in the Lincoln Center Off-Broadway production of Waiting for Godot, in 1988, in the role of Lucky. Lucky's only lines consist of a famous 500-word-long monologue, an ironic element for Irwin since much of his clown-based stage work was silent.

He directed the 1998 Roundabout Theatre Company production of A Flea in Her Ear. He appeared in 2002 with Sally Field in the replacement cast of The Goat or Who is Sylvia? In 2005, he starred as George alongside Kathleen Turner in a revival of Edward Albee's Who's Afraid of Virginia Woolf?, for which he won a Tony Award. He played Vladimir (Didi) in the 2009 Broadway revival of Waiting for Godot, and Mr. McAfee in the Broadway revival of Bye Bye Birdie. In 2011, he appeared in King Lear at the Public Theatre. In 2023, he played Clov in the Irish Repertory Theatre's Off-Broadway production of Endgame.

Film and television
Irwin's first featured film role was in 1980, appearing as Harold Hamgravy in Robert Altman's Popeye starring Robin Williams. He has appeared in over 20 films, mainly in supporting roles. Irwin's principal film roles include playing Eddie Collins in Eight Men Out, which tells the true story of the "Black Sox" gambling scandal of 1919, and My Blue Heaven, a 1990 comedy with Steve Martin and Rick Moranis. Irwin tap-danced in a leading role in 1991's Stepping Out with Liza Minnelli, appeared as a mime in the Paul Mazursky film Scenes from a Mall alongside Woody Allen and Bette Midler, and played Charlie Sheen's father in Hot Shots! (1991).  His authentic vaudevillian skills landed him a role in the Sam Shepard film Silent Tongue in 1994, and he appeared in film adaptations of How the Grinch Stole Christmas, The Laramie Project and A Midsummer Night's Dream. He played an ex-brain surgeon and house salesman in the Nickelodeon series The Adventures of Pete & Pete. In 2006, Irwin played the solitary Mr. Leeds in M. Night Shyamalan's Lady in the Water and had a small role as Uncle Teddy in 2007's Across the Universe. He received critical acclaim for his role as Paul, father to Anne Hathaway's character Kym, in the 2008 drama Rachel Getting Married.

Irwin's most notable television roles have been Enrico Ballati, "The Flying Man", on the television series Northern Exposure, Mr. Noodle in the Elmo's World segment of the PBS children's show Sesame Street, and the "Dick & Jane" serial killer Nate Haskell on CSI: Crime Scene Investigation. He was featured in the 1988 music video of "Don't Worry, Be Happy" by Bobby McFerrin (along with McFerrin and Robin Williams) and the 1996 music video of "Let Me into Your Heart" by Mary Chapin Carpenter. Irwin was also featured in HBO's 1997 production Subway Stories. He has also appeared on The Cosby Show, Saturday Night Live, 3rd Rock from the Sun, Law & Order, and Lights Out.

In 2011, Irwin guest starred in the pilot episode of the CBS television drama A Gifted Man. He starred in the 2013 medical drama TNT television series, Monday Mornings as Buck Tierney. In 2014, he guest starred in the episode "The One Percent Solution" of CBS' Elementary.

Irwin voices the robot TARS in the film Interstellar and puppeteers the robot in most scenes (those which are not computer-generated). He is featured in the PBS series Great Performances, in the episode titled "Bill Irwin, Clown Prince", initially broadcast in December 2004.

He regularly appears on the NBC crime series Law & Order: Special Victims Unit as therapist Dr. Peter Lindstrom. Lindstrom normally appears on the show while counseling main character Lieutenant Olivia Benson. Irwin also appeared on the television series Sleepy Hollow, playing the character of Atticus Nevins. Between 2017 and 2019, he appeared in the FX television series Legion.

In 2020, he appeared as Su'Kal in Star Trek: Discovery. In 2022, Irwin guest starred on The Gilded Age on HBO.

Personal life
He is married to Martha Roth, an "actress-turned-nurse midwife", whom he met while seeking treatment for a stiff neck. They have an adopted son, Santos Patrick Morales Irwin, who was born in 1991.

Awards and honors
Irwin was awarded the National Endowment for the Arts Choreographer's Fellowship in 1981 and 1983. In 1984, he was named a Guggenheim Fellow and was the first performance artist to be awarded a five-year MacArthur Fellowship. For Largely New York, he won a New York Drama Critics Circle Special Citation in 1988, and an Outer Critics Circle Award and Drama Desk Award in 1989. This show also received five nominations for Tony Awards.

In 1992, he won an Obie Award for his performance in Texts for Nothing. Together with David Shiner, he won a special Tony Award for Live Theatrical Presentation in 1999 for their show Fool Moon. In 1993, this show had already won a Drama Desk Award for "Unique Theatrical Experience" and an Outer Critics Circle "Special Achievement" Award.

In 2000, the Jazz Tap Ensemble in Los Angeles received a $10,000 grant from the National Endowment for the Arts (NEA) "for a commission of a new work by Bill Irwin." In 2004, the Signature Theatre Company, New York, received a $40,000 NEA grant for "the world premiere production of 'Mr. Fox: A Rumination' by Bill Irwin."

In 2005, he won the Tony Award for Best Actor in a Play for his appearance as George in the revival of Edward Albee's Who's Afraid of Virginia Woolf?.

Irwin received a 2008 CFCA Award nomination for "Best Supporting Actor" for his role in Rachel Getting Married. In 2010, The New Victory Theater presented Irwin with the first-ever New Victory Arts Award. He was honored for "bringing the arts to kids and kids to the arts." Nathan Lane and Jonathan Demme spoke at the ceremony. Irwin is also on the board of The New 42nd Street, Inc.

Filmography and stage work

References

External links

Bill Irwin - Official Site
Bill Irwin - Archival Site
 
 
 
 The Regard of Flight from The New York Times (Registration required) (1984)
 The Harlequin Studies (2003)
 Archive film of Bill Irwin performing Post-Modern Studies in 1983 at Jacob's Pillow
 "A Clown Changes Costume and, Presto: Playwright" - The New York Times

1950 births
American clowns
American male film actors
American male television actors
Bessie Award winners
Living people
MacArthur Fellows
American mimes
Oberlin College alumni
Tony Award winners
Male actors from Santa Monica, California
20th-century American male actors
21st-century American male actors
20th-century American dramatists and playwrights
American theatre directors
American male stage actors